John Messer may refer to:
 John Rissler Messer, member of the Legislative Assembly of Saskatchewan
 John Rutherford Messer, member of the Legislative Assembly of New Brunswick